"The Changingman" is a song released in the spring of 1995 by British singer-songwriter Paul Weller as the lead single from his album, Stanley Road. It charted at number 7 on the UK Singles Chart.

The song featuring backgrounds loop from ELOs 10538 Overture.

Background
"The Changingman" was co-written by Brendan Lynch, and performed, written and produced by Paul Weller, who sings and plays guitar, piano and shakers on the record. Carleen Anderson provides back-up vocals, as does Steve Cradock and Dr. Robert, who also play the guitar and bass guitar respectively. In addition, Steve White plays drums and Lynch played the Cyremin. Weller claimed that the song's title came from the name his daughter Leah gave to one of her dolls, although at the time his friend Terry Rawlings managed a band called that. The song expresses Weller's mantra of breaking things up if they are getting too comfortable; the previous year, he had divorced his wife, Dee C. Lee, breaking up what appeared to the public to be a happy marriage. In an interview with Mojo in 2010, he expressed that this was because there were senses "that things were going too well, we were too happy, too comfortable, everything seemed too nice [and] that for me as a writer and an artist I might lose my edge. I had to break the shape up, re-arrange things", noting that said turmoil supplanted the lyrics of the entire parent album and stated that the lyric 'numbed by the effect, aware of the muse, too in touch with myself, I light the fuse' "was about the process of causing chaos around you".

Cover versions
This song was covered by Rod Stewart, which was released on the compilation album "The Rod Stewart Sessions 1971-1998" in 2009.

Chart performance
The song peaked at number 7 on the UK Singles Chart, spending four weeks on the chart and becoming his first solo top ten hit.

Music video
A music video was produced for the song. It alternates between clips of Weller singing and playing guitar, shots of model Anjela Lauren Smith dancing, and assorted symbols.

Certifications

References

1995 singles
1995 songs
Songs written by Paul Weller